Qaryat Al Faw was the capital of the first Kindah kingdom. It is located about 100 km south of Wadi ad-Dawasir, and about 700 km southwest of Riyadh, the capital city of Saudi Arabia. The Al Faw archeological site reveals various features such as residential houses, markets, roads, cemeteries, temples, and water wells.

It is home to a 1st century BC Old Arabic inscription written in the Ancient South Arabian script which is one of the oldest of its kind in South Arabia.

History 
Researchers know little about the city. According to archaeological excavations, the city dates to the fourth century BC. The city was originally known per the corpus of inscriptions in the site as Qaryat Dhu Kahl. Kahl was the main deity worshiped by the Arab tribes of Kindah and Madh'hij. It is also known by the names of Qaryat al-Hamraa (Red City) and Dhat al-Jnan (City of Gardens) by the inhabitants in its period of prosperity.

The golden age of the city stretched for nearly eight centuries between the 4th century BC and 4th century AD before it was abandoned. In its long period, the city survived various attacks from neighboring states, as suggested by late 2nd century AD Sabaean accounts. Also the inscription of Namara mention the expedition of Imru' al-Qays ibn 'Amr into Najran where he reached Qaryat al-Faw and drove the ruling tribe of Madh'hij from the city. It was never mentioned after that incident again, except in a brief account by al-Hamdani.

Archaeological digging revealed that the city developed from a small caravan passing station, into an important commercial, religious, and urban centre in central Arabia, Najd.

Architecture 
Al Faw village is located on the northwestern border of the Empty Quarter, thus, it is located on the trade route that connects the south of the Arabian Peninsula with its north-east. Al Faw was an important trade hub and had more than seventeen water wells.

Discovery
Interest in Qaryat al-Fāw as an archaeological site dates back to the 1940s when a reference to it was made by some workers of the Saudi Aramco oil company. In 1952, three of the company's staff visited the city and wrote about it. In 1996, the village was visited by an expert from the Antiquities and Museums agency. In 1976, it was visited first the History and Antiquities Association of King Saud University in Riyadh and then by the Department of Antiquities and Museums, both aiming to study the site, and more specifically, to identify the location of the city. The work took place between 1972 and 1995. Archaeological excavations were carried out by a team from King Saud University team, from 1970 to 2003, and uncovered two major sectors of the town. The first was a residential area, consisting of houses, squares, streets and a market place, while the second was a sacred area, consisting of temples and tombs. The general architectural plan is very indicative of pre-Islamic towns in Arabia. Abdulrahman al-Ansary, former Professor of Archaeology at King Saud University in Riyadh and a member of Saudi Arabia's Consultative Council and of the Council's Committee on Education is considered as the founder of the rediscovery of the city of Qaryat al-Fāw.

Current Condition
As of January 1, 2014, the site is completely fenced for protection against looters by the Saudi Government. The site is tended by a Saudi caretaker whose family has ties to the immediate area.  The site was authorized and allocated funds for significant improvement, preservation and the construction of a modern visitors center.  Construction was to have been completed by December, 2013, however to date no construction has started.
The site is extremely impressive, with multiple Nobelmans and Warrior class tombs spaced along the Eastern periphery.  The Kings tomb resides somewhat separated and to the North West of the City.  The market place shows significant erosion of the walls, which have buried almost an entire story of the once 3 or 4 level artifice.  Remnants of grain storage and baking ovens can still be seen today.
Located East of the city lies a large jebel, with significant caves and petroglyphs.

Gallery

References

External links
 Al Faw Village on Arabic Wikipedia. (Google Translate)

Archaeology of Saudi Arabia
Former populated places in Southwest Asia
Riyadh Province